Three ships of the United States Navy have been named Asp, named for the Asp, which is a small venomous snake.

, was a schooner that served on the Great Lakes during the War of 1812.
, was a schooner that served in Chesapeake Bay.
, was a wooden motor boat which patrolled the coast from 1917 until 1920.

United States Navy ship names